The men's triple jump event at the 1989 Summer Universiade was held at the Wedaustadion in Duisburg on 27 and 29 August 1989.

Medalists

Results

Qualification
Qualifying distance: 16.00 metres

Final

References

Athletics at the 1989 Summer Universiade
1989